Chaghcharān, also called Firozkoh, is a town and district in central Afghanistan, which serves as the capital of Ghor Province. It is located on the southern side of the Hari River, at an altitude of 2,230 m above sea level. The town is served by Chaghcharan Airport.

Chaghcharan has a population of about 15,000 who are mostly Dari and Pashto speakers. However the recent data showed a population of 31,266 (in 2015). It has 1 district and a total land area of 2,614 Hectares. The total number of dwellings in the city are 3,474.

History

Medieval

Prior to the arrival of Islam the region's inhabitants practiced various different religions including Zoroastrianism, Buddhism, Hinduism. The Islamic conquest of Afghanistan by Sultan Mahmud of Ghazni took place in the 10th century. After the defeat of the Ghaznavids in the 12th century the area came under the control of the local Ghurid dynasty of Ghor. The Ghurid Dynasty had its summer capital, Firozkoh nearby and they constructed the Minaret of Jam there. Today the Minaret of Jam is a UNESCO World Heritage Site.

In the 13th century, the Ghor region was invaded by the Mongol army who destroyed Firozkoh but left the Minaret of Jam intact. It was then ruled by the Ilkhanate until Timur conquered it in the 14th century.

Chakhcherān is mentioned by name in the 16th century Baburnama, describing Babur's visit in early 1507 while on his journey to Kabul. It was a town located in the Gharjistan region, between Herat, Ghor, and Ghazni.

Modern era

In 2004, an independent FM radio station (Persian: راديو صداي صلح or Voice of Peace Radio) came on air in the town, the first independent media in this part of Afghanistan.

In June 2005, the International Security Assistance Force (ISAF) established a Lithuanian led Provincial Reconstruction Team in which Croatian, Danish, American, Ukrainian, Icelandic, and Georgian troops also served.

On 14 May 2020, the Taliban attacked a checkpoint in Chaghcharan, killing three Afghan soldiers and taking 11 others captive.

In August 2021, Chaghcharan was seized by Taliban fighters, became the sixteenth provincial capital to be seized by Taliban as part of wider 2021 Taliban offensive.

Demography

The population of Chaghcharan was reported in 2020 as 150,982 total. Of this, 7,918 reside in the urban area and the remaining in the surrounding countryside. The main inhabitants of Chaghcharan are Tajiks, with Pashtuns and Hazaras being the minority.

Land use
Chaghcharan (Ferozkoh) is located at the central region of Afghanistan connected by a highway 380 km West to Herat and about the same East to Kabul. Ferozkoh is an ancient city that dates back to Genghis Khan and Mongols. Ferozkoh is famous for agriculture and animal husbandry.

Transportation

As of August 2015, Chaghcharan Airport, located northwest of the Hari River, one mile northeast of Chaghcharan, had regularly scheduled flights to Kabul and Herat. However, as of January 2016 commercial operators no longer offer scheduled flights, leaving the United Nations Humanitarian Air Service (UNHAS) as the only user of Chaghcharan Airport with flights to Kabul and Herat.

The main road from Changhcharan runs toward Herat in the west and Kabul in the east. Due to severe weather, the road is often closed during winter and even in summer it can take three full days to drive from Chagcharan to Kabul.

Economy
Agriculture and animal husbandry are the primary economic activities in Ghor Province.

Climate

Chaghcharan has a warm-summer humid continental climate (Köppen Dsb), with snowy winters and warm, dry summers. Precipitation is low, and mostly falls in winter and spring.

See also 
Districts of Afghanistan
List of cities in Afghanistan

References and footnotes

External links 

Dupree, Nancy Hatch (1977): An Historical Guide to Afghanistan. 1st Edition: 1970. 2nd Edition. Revised and Enlarged. Afghan Tourist Organization. (Chapter 32 - Chakhcharan to Herat)

Populated places in Ghor Province
Provincial capitals in Afghanistan